Devaney, Devany, and O'Devaney, is a surname derived from the Irish Ó/Mac Duibheamhna, meaning "descendants/son of Dubheamhna". They are cited by O'Dugan as being chiefs of Kinelawley in the over-kingdom of Ulaid, now known as Clanawley in present-day County Down, Northern Ireland.

Ó Duibheamhna derives from a personal name based on the Irish word dubh, meaning "black", and the genitive of Eamhain, the Irish name for Navan fort located in County Armagh, Northern Ireland. It was the former capital of Ulaid. Another family/clan was based in the diocese of Raphoe, in Donegal, Republic of Ireland, and may be a distinct branch.

The surname was considered by Woulfe in 1923 as being obsolete or changed into some other English or Irish form.

Devaney may refer to:
 Aidan Devaney, Sligo Gaelic football goalkeeper
 Bob Devaney (1915–1997), football coach
 Charlotte Devaney (born 1988), British DJ
 Francis Devaney (born 1984), young hurling champion
 James Devaney (1890–1976), poet
 John Devaney, businessman
 John P. Devaney (born 1883), judge.
 June Anne Devaney, (1944–1948), English murder victim
 Liam Devaney (born 1935), hurling champion
 Martin Devaney (born 1980), footballer
 Michael Devaney (racing driver) (born 1984), Irish racing driver
 Michael Aloysius Devaney, track and field athlete
 Michael S. Devany, American admiral
 Robert L. Devaney (born 1948), American mathematician
 Sue Devaney 
 Tom Devaney (died 1976), mobster

References

Anglicised Irish-language surnames
Irish royal families
Ulaid